Bogside Racecourse was a horse racing track situated in Irvine, Scotland, on the banks of the River Irvine.  Its first meeting was held on 7 June 1808, and its last on 10 April 1965, although there is evidence of an event known as the Irvine Marymass Races in the area as far back as 1636, initiated by the Earl of Eglinton.

Bogside's flat course was an undulating, right-handed triangular course of two miles in length.  Its jumps course, meanwhile, was two and a half miles round, with nine plain fences, two open ditches and one water jump.  It was here that the first steeplechase recorded in Scotland took place on 25 April 1839.

During its existence it hosted the Scottish Grand National (now contested at nearby Ayr) and twice hosted the National Hunt Chase Challenge Cup which now takes place at the Cheltenham Festival.  Its other major race was the Bogside Cup.

Among the most notable achievements at the course was jockey Alec Russell riding all six winners in a day on 19 July 1957.

For a short time the racecourse had its own railway station, Bogside Racecourse.

In 1963, the Levy Board opted to cease funding the course, declaring 'When Ayr is developed as the main Scottish course, racing under both rules, the retention of Bogside, only 12 miles away, cannot be economically justified'.  Racing at Bogside ceased soon thereafter.

Point-to-Point meetings took place at Bogside until 1994, and evidence of the former racecourse still remains.

See also
List of British racecourses

References

1808 establishments in Scotland
Defunct horse racing venues in Scotland
1965 disestablishments in Scotland
Sports venues completed in 1808
Sports venues in North Ayrshire
Irvine, North Ayrshire